The Independence for Scotland Party (ISP) (Scottish Gaelic: Pàrtaidh Neo-eisimeileachd do dh'Alba) is a political party in Scotland which supports Scottish independence within the European Free Trade Association (EFTA).

History
The party was founded in 2020 and was registered by the Electoral Commission on 7 May 2020.

On 8 January 2021, Roddy McCuish became the first elected representative of the ISP, when he joined the party while on Argyll and Bute Council, having been elected as an independent and then later moving to the party. He had been both a Scottish National Party representative and an independent. In March 2022, McCuish announced that he would not be standing for re-election at the 5 May 2022 Scottish local elections.

In November 2020, the party came under fire for quoting Kenny MacAskill's published view on constituency versus list voting. MacAskill issued a statement saying that the advert was made without his consent.

The ISP had planned to stand fourteen list candidates in the 2021 Scottish Parliament election, one in South Scotland and Glasgow and two in the remaining six regions. However, after  the Alba Party announced their formation and decision to compete in the election, they withdrew their candidates.

References

External Links
  Independence for Scotland Party – Official website

2020 establishments in Scotland
Organisations based in Glasgow
Political parties established in 2020
Scottish independence
Scottish nationalist parties